Richard Župa (born 27 April 1998) is a Slovak footballer who plays for Tatran Liptovský Mikuláš as a defender.

Career

1. FC Tatran Prešov
Župa made his professional debut for Tatran Prešov against Spartak Trnava on 16 April 2017 during a 4:0 defeat, coming on as a replacement for Peter Katona.

References

External links
 
 Ligy.sk profile 
 
 Futbalnet Profile 

1998 births
Living people
Sportspeople from Prešov
Slovak footballers
Association football defenders
1. FC Tatran Prešov players
FK Pohronie players
Partizán Bardejov players
MFK Tatran Liptovský Mikuláš players
Slovak Super Liga players
2. Liga (Slovakia) players